Eva Natus-Šalamounová (27 June 1936 – 28 February 2018) was a Czech graphic artist and filmmaker.

Biography
Born in Halle, Natus-Šalamounová studied from 1954 until 1960 at the  under . In the latter year she became an associate professor at the Academy of Arts, Architecture and Design in Prague, where she remained until 1963. She also worked at the Film and TV School of the Academy of Performing Arts in Prague. Active as a printmaker, she also produced illustrations for books and magazines and worked in the field of animation. She died in Halle. One of her prints is in the collection of the National Gallery of Art.

Filmography
Jolli (1964–1965) 35mm, colour, animated
Der Igel Tappelpit (1965–1966) 35mm, colour, animated
Dinge gibts - die gibts Nicht! (1964) 35mm, colour, animated

References

1936 births
2018 deaths
Czech printmakers
Women printmakers
20th-century Czech artists
20th-century printmakers
20th-century Czech women artists
21st-century Czech artists
21st-century printmakers
21st-century Czech women artists
People from Halle (Saale)
Academic staff of the Academy of Arts, Architecture and Design in Prague